Ernst Emil Ulbricht (1864–1900) was a German-born American racing cyclist and winner of the silver medal in the Stayer competition at International Cycling Association's first World Championships in Chicago in 1893. As a road racer he won the time prize in the 1894 and 1895 editions of the Santa Monica Road Race.

Death
By 1900, Ulbricht was working for the Honolulu Iron Works. During a weekend excursion he drowned after being taken by surprise by a huge wave near Makapuʻu Point in Hawaii. His body was found a few days later inside a giant shark that was captured and killed by local fishermen. After the autopsy the coroner concluded that the corps must have been eaten by the shark after drowning.

References

1864 births
1900 deaths
American track cyclists
American male cyclists